The Constitution of Prussia, was the first constitution of the Kingdom of Prussia. It was promulgated on 5 December 1848 by Frederick William IV, in response to the revolutions of 1848. Thereby committing himself to unification (i.e. the German question), forming a liberal government and convening a national assembly.

External links
 Text of the Constitution 

Constitutions of Germany
Politics of Prussia
1848 in Prussia
1848 in Germany
1848 in law
1848 documents